Evdokia Tsamoglou (born December 15, 1978, in Thessaloniki) is a female  hammer thrower from Greece. Her personal best throw is 68.12 metres, achieved in August 2003 in Nikiti, Sithonia. This places her third on the Greek all-time list, behind Alexandra Papayeoryiou and Stiliani Papadopoulou.

Honours

References

1978 births
Living people
Greek female hammer throwers
Athletes (track and field) at the 2004 Summer Olympics
Olympic athletes of Greece
Athletes from Thessaloniki
Competitors at the 2001 Summer Universiade
21st-century Greek women